Charles Wilcox may refer to:

Charles Willcox, mayor of Adelaide
Charles F. Wilcox (1845–1905), American architect
Charles Henry Wilcox (1880–1920) Representative in the Territory of Hawaii legislature
Charles S. Wilcox (1856–1938), first president of Iron and Steel Company of Canada, later called Stelco
Charles Smith Wilcox (1852–1909), Nova Scotia politician